Cassette 50 (released in Spain as Galaxy 50 - 50 Excitantes Juegos) is a compilation of games published by Cascade Games Ltd in 1983, and is an early example of shovelware - computer software marketed primarily on the basis of its sheer quantity rather than other factors such as quality or playability. The compilation was available for many of the microcomputer platforms of the time due to being entirely coded in BASIC.

The compilation was heavily advertised in home computer magazines, with buyers also receiving a Timex digital calculator watch with each purchase. 

According to the instructions, "the games will provide many hours of entertainment for all the family at a fraction of the cost of other computer games".

In an interview, Matthew Lewis, the author of Galaxy Defence, said he wrote the game when he was 14 and submitted it in response to a small, anonymous ad in a local newspaper. He was paid £10 for his game, but he had to give up all rights to it. Galaxy Defence took 12 hours to code and the graphics were done by his father, Ernest Lewis.

Content
The games featured differed depending on the platform, all of which were written in BASIC. Some like Star Trek and Maze Eater appeared on all versions. Others like Lunar Lander were ports or clones of very early or popular games, while others were sourced from independent developers. Some games that had the same title were entirely different depending on which version. Some games also had playability issues.

Acorn Electron / Commodore 64 / Dragon 32 / Oric-1 / Oric Atmos / ZX81

 Attacker
 Barrel Jump
 Black Hole
 Boggles
 Cannonball Battle
 Derby Dash
 Do Your Sums
 Dynamite
 Exchange
 Force Field
 Galactic Attack
 Galactic Dog Fight
 Ghosts
 Hangman
 High Rise
 Inferno
 Intruder
 
 Ivasive Action
 Jet Flight
 Jet Mobile
 Lunar Landing
 Maze Eater
 Motorway
 Nim
 Noughts and Crosses
 Old Bones
 Orbitter
 Overtake
 Parachute
 Phaser
 Planets
 Plasma Bolt
 Pontoon
 Psion Attack
 
 Radar Landing
 Rats
 Rocket Launch
 Sitting Target
 Ski Jump
 Smash the Windows
 Space Mission
 Space Search
 Space Ship
 Star Trek
 Submarines
 Tanker
 The Force
 Thin Ice
 Tunnel Escape
 Universe

The games Exchange and The Force, although listed on the inlay, are missing from the Acorn Electron version, meaning only 48 games actually appeared on the cassette. There was a second release of the Dragon 32 version which had different versions of some of the games. Tunnel Escape on the C64 version is credited as such in the game's inlay but is credited as "Escape or Bust" in the actual game.

Amstrad CPC

 3-D Maze 
 Attacker
 Backgammon
 Colony-9
 Craps
 Creepy Crawley
 Cylons
 Day at the Races
 Dragona Maze
 Draughts
 Dungeon Adventure
 Dynamite
 Evasive Action
 Exchange
 Fantasy Land
 Fighter Command
 Fireman Rescue
 
 Ghosts 
 Handicap Golf
 Hangman
 High Rise
 Hopping Herbert
 Inferno
 Intruder
 Jet Flight
 Lunar Lander
 Maze Eater
 Motorway
 Nemesis IV
 Noughts & Crosses
 Planets
 Play Your Cards Right
 Pontoon Bet
 Rally 3000
 
 Rats
 Rush Hour Attack
 Royal Rescue
 Sitting Target
 Solit
 Space Base
 Space Mission
 Space Pod Rescue
 Space Ship
 Star Trek
 The Kings Orb
 Three Card Brag
 Timebomb
 Trucking
 Whirly
 Yamzee

Atari

 Attacker
 Baby Chase!
 Barrel Jump!
 Black Hole
 Boggles
 Cannon Ball Battle
 Derby Dash
 Defend the Fortress
 Do Your Sums
 Dynamite
 Exchange
 Galactic Attack
 Ghosts 
 Hangman
 High Rise
 Inferno!
 Intruder!
 
 Ivasive Action
 Jet Fighter
 Jetmobile
 Lunar Landing
 Maze Eater
 Motorway
 Nim
 Noughts and Crosses
 Old Bones 
 Orbitter
 Overtake
 Parachute
 Phaser
 Planets
 Plasma Bolt
 Pontoon
 Zion Attack
 
 Rabbit Raid
 Radar Lander
 Rats
 Rocket Launch
 Sea Alert 
 Sitting Target
 Ski Jump
 Smash the Windows
 Space Mission
 Space Search
 Space Ship
 Star Trek
 Tanker
 The Force
 Tunnel Escape
 Universe

BBC Micro

 Attacker
 Barrel Jump
 Black Hole
 Boggles
 Cannon Ball
 Derby Dash
 Dice Thrower
 Dynamite
 Exchange
 Force Field
 Galactic Attack
 Galactic Dogfight
 Ghosts
 Hangman
 High Rise
 Inferno
 Intruder
 
 Ivasive Action
 Jet Flight
 Jet Mobile
 Lunar Landing
 Maze Eater
 Motorway
 Nim
 Noughts and Crosses
 Old Bones
 Orbitter
 Overtake
 Parachute
 Phaser
 Planets
 Plasma Bolt
 Pontoon
 Psion Attack
 
 Radar Landing
 Rats
 Rocket Launch
 Sitting Target
 Ski Jump
 Smash the Windows
 Space Mission
 Space Search
 Space Ship
 Star Trek
 Submarines
 Tanker
 The Force
 Thin Ice
 Tunnel Escape
 Universe

The game Dice Thrower is mistakenly displayed in the inlay as "Do Your Sums" .

Vic-20

 Balloon Dodger
 Bank Raid
 Bomber
 Cupid's Arrow
 Derby Dash
 Do Your Sums
 Dustman Dan
 Exchange
 Flesh Eaters
 Force Field
 Galactic Dogfight
 Golf
 Grid Racer 
 Hangman
 Houses
 Intruder
 Jet Flight
 
 Jet Mobile
 Knight Out
 Krazy
 Lite Bikes
 Lunar Lander
 Maze Eater
 Meteoroids
 Minotaur's Treasure
 Mole Hole
 Motorway
 Nim
 Noughts & Crosses
 One Armed Bandit
 Orbitter
 PanAttack
 Planetoids
 Plasma Bolt
 
 Pontoon
 Radar Landing
 Sentinel-1
 Ski Run
 Skull Castle
 Soccer
 Space Search
 Spaceship
 Star Falls
 Star Trek
 Submarines
 Super Hi-Low
 Super Vaders
 Thin Ice
 Three Card Brag
 Turtle Bridge

ZX Spectrum

 Alien #27
 Alien Attack #10
 Attacker #49
 Barrel Jump #48
 Basketball #3
 Blitz #42
 Boggles #9
 Bowls #33
 Breakout #5
 Cargo #28
 Cars #22
 Cavern #25
 Crusher #6     
 Cypher #46
 Dragon's Gold #36
 Field #35
 Fishing Mission #43
 
 Frogger #4
 Galaxy Defence #45
 Inferno #38
 Jet Mobile #47
 Labyrinth #15
 Laser #26
 Lunar Lander #11
 Martian Knock Out #8
 Mazer Eater #12     
 Microtrap #13
 Motorway #14
 Munch #32
 Muncher #1
 Mystical Diamonds #44
 Nim #39
 Orbit #31
 Pinball #24
 
 Race Track #17
 Raiders #34
 Sketch Pad #41
 Ski Jump #2
 Ski Run #18 
 Skittles #16
 Solar Ship #20
 Space Mission #50
 Space Search #37
 Star Trek #7
 Stomper #23
 Tanks #19
 Ten Pins #21
 The Race #29
 The Skull #30
 Voyager #40

The number with the '#' symbol represents the order in which the games appear on the tape.

'Star Trek' appears in the cassette booklet as 'Startrek', and 'Jet Mobile' appears as 'Jetmobile'.

Reception
The games, almost without exception written in BASIC, were deemed to be of poor quality. They have been described as "so bad it caused physical discomfort", "beyond awful", and "a piece of crap collection". The poor quality of the games inspired the annual Crap Games Competitions (for example the comp.sys.sinclair Crap Games Competition and the C64 Crap Game Compo) and a now-defunct site reviewing bad games.

See also
 Don't Buy This - Another infamous collection of poor ZX Spectrum titles that were submitted to Firebird (though it was purposely released by the publisher as a joke, at the expense of the original developers).
 Action 52 - A collection of 52 games on a single NES cartridge, in a similar spirit to Cassette 50 and with similarly poor reception.
 List of video games notable for negative reception
 Caltron 6 in 1 -  A compilation of six games that are inferior clones of other popular games.

References

External links
 
 
 Cassette 50 ZX81 Collection entry with the original inlay scan and program listing.  An emulator is available on the site to play the game online.

1983 video games
Video game compilations
Amstrad CPC games
Apple II games
Atari 8-bit family games
BBC Micro and Acorn Electron games
Commodore 64 games
Dragon 32 games
Oric games
Video games developed in the United Kingdom
ZX81 games
ZX Spectrum games